In mathematical analysis, Glaeser's continuity theorem is a characterization of the continuity of the derivative of the square roots of functions of class . It was introduced in 1963 by Georges Glaeser, and was later simplified by Jean Dieudonné.

References

Theorems in analysis